Bartłomiej Kluth (born 20 December 1992) is a Polish professional volleyball player, a two–time Champions League winner (2021, 2022), and the current PlusLiga record holder in number of scored points in one match (40). At the professional club level, he plays for ZAKSA Kędzierzyn-Koźle.

Honours

Clubs
 CEV Champions League
  2020/2021 – with ZAKSA Kędzierzyn-Koźle
  2021/2022 – with ZAKSA Kędzierzyn-Koźle

 National championships
 2020/2021  Polish SuperCup, with ZAKSA Kędzierzyn-Koźle
 2020/2021  Polish Cup, with ZAKSA Kędzierzyn-Koźle
 2021/2022  Polish Cup, with ZAKSA Kędzierzyn-Koźle
 2021/2022  Polish Championship, with ZAKSA Kędzierzyn-Koźle
 2022/2023  Polish Cup, with ZAKSA Kędzierzyn-Koźle

References

External links
 
 Player profile at LegaVolley.it 
 Player profile at PlusLiga.pl 
 Player profile at Volleybox.net

1992 births
Living people
People from Lidzbark County
Sportspeople from Warmian-Masurian Voivodeship
Polish men's volleyball players
Polish expatriate sportspeople in Israel
Expatriate volleyball players in Israel
Polish expatriate sportspeople in Italy
Expatriate volleyball players in Italy
Ślepsk Suwałki players
Blu Volley Verona players
ZAKSA Kędzierzyn-Koźle players
Opposite hitters